David M. Williams may refer to:

David Marshall Williams (1900–1975), American designer of the short-stroke piston used in the M1 Carbine
Carbine Williams, a 1952 American film starring James Stewart as Williams
David Williams (rugby union) (c. 1894–c. 1959), Australian rugby union player

See also
David Williams (disambiguation)